The Hunan University of Finance and Economics is a university located in Yuelu District, Changsha, Hunan, China.

As of 2021, Hunan University of Finance and Economics ranked 2nd in Hunan and 43th nationwide among universities specialized in finance, business, and economics in the recent edition of the recognized Best Chinese Universities Ranking.

History 
The university was founded in April 1933. It was initially called "Housheng Private Accounting Institute".

In February 2010, it was renamed to "Hunan College of Finance and Economics".

As of fall 2013, the university has one campuses, a combined student body of 9,000 students, 500 faculty members.

Academics 
The university consists of one college and seven departments, with 36 specialties for undergraduates. The university covers a total area of 846 mu, with more than 300,000 square meters of floor space.
 School of Adult education 
 Department of Accounting 
 Department of Fiscal Finance 
 Department of Information Management
 Department of Business Administration
 Department of Law and Public Administration 
 Department of Foreign Languages 
 Department of Engineering Management

Library collections 
Hunan College of Finance and Economics's total collections amount to more than 920,000 items.

Culture 
 Motto:

References

External links 
 

Universities and colleges in Hunan
Business schools in China
Educational institutions established in 1933
Education in Changsha
1933 establishments in China
Universities and colleges in Changsha
Yuelu District